XEABC-AM is a radio station in Mexico City, licensed to San Sebastián Chimalpa in the State of Mexico. Broadcasting on 760 kHz, XEABC is owned by México Radio, S.A. de C.V., concessionaire for the Estudios Tepeyac division of Radio Cañon, and broadcasts a talk radio format as "Radio Cañón".

760 AM is a United States clear-channel frequency.  WJR in Detroit, Michigan is the only Class A station on this frequency.

History
XEABC signed on August 20, 1964. Its ownership has not changed throughout its history, and neither has its talk format.

XEABC relies on the resources of Organización Editorial Mexicana newspapers, which are co-owned with Estudios Tepeyac and XEABC.

This station is the provider of programming to 24 radio stations across Mexico. Of these, two carry similar callsigns: XEABCJ-AM 1440 in Guadalajara and XEABCA-AM 820 in Mexicali.

In April 2021, NTR acquired the ABC Radio network from OEM. XEABC was rebranded as "760 AM", until August 15, 2022 when it adopted the name "Radio Cañón", name used on old ABC Radio stations, based on XHTGO-FM.

External links
FCC information for XEABC

References

Radio stations established in 1964
Radio stations in Mexico City
Radio stations in the State of Mexico